Noy was a short-lived one-man political faction in Israel created by David Tal.

Background
Noy was established by Haredi Knesset member David Tal on 23 May 2005. Previously Tal had been a member of One Nation, which was about to merge into the Israeli Labor Party, a move Tal was opposed to. 

On 23 November 2005 the faction was dissolved when Tal merged it into Ariel Sharon's new Kadima party.

References

External links
Noy Knesset website

Political parties established in 2005

Defunct political parties in Israel
Political parties disestablished in 2005
2005 establishments in Israel
2005 disestablishments in Israel